Jabri (also Romanized as Jabrī) is a village in Khvormuj Rural District, in the Central District of Dashti County, Bushehr Province, Iran. At the 2006 census, its population was 22, in 5 families.

References 

Populated places in Dashti County